Reeltime is an album by Wynton Marsalis, released in 1999 through Sony Music Distribution. The album peaked at number 17 on Billboard Top Jazz Albums chart. The album had originally been commissioned as the soundtrack for the 1997 John Singleton film Rosewood, but was ultimately not used.

Reception
Richard S. Ginell of AllMusic wrote, "It's good to hear Marsalis stretching himself all over the spectrum of music of the American South, and always from the point of view of a staunch, respectful traditionalist." C. Michael Bailey of All About Jazz said of the album, "The music here is very fine, reflecting the vision of a controversial figure forging a new path with old methods."

Track list

References

1999 albums
Sony Records albums
Wynton Marsalis albums